Olga Firsova (born April 23, 1976) is a former professional basketball player.

College
Firsova earned a degree in marketing and international business.

Kansas State statistics
Source

Honors and awards
Two-time Academic All-Big 12 honorable mention choice 
Two-time All-Big 12 honorable mention selection.

Personal life
She became a United States citizen on July 25, 2008.

References

External links
WNBA.com: New York Liberty Draft History

1976 births
Living people
American women's basketball players
Centers (basketball)
Junior college women's basketball players in the United States
New York Liberty draft picks
New York Liberty players
Kansas State Wildcats women's basketball players
People with acquired American citizenship
Basketball players from Kyiv
Ukrainian expatriate basketball people in the United States
Ukrainian women's basketball players
Weatherford College alumni